Hills Road Sixth Form College (commonly referred to as HRSFC, Hills Road or just Hills) is a public sector co-educational sixth form college in Cambridge, England, providing full-time A-level courses for approximately 2000 sixth form students from the surrounding area and a wide variety of courses to around 4,000 part-time students of all ages in the adult education programme, held as daytime and evening classes.

History
Hills Road Sixth Form College was established on 15 September 1974 on the site of the former Cambridgeshire High School for Boys, when education in Cambridgeshire was reorganised on a comprehensive basis, and grammar schools and secondary moderns were replaced by a system of (mainly) 11-16 comprehensive schools and sixth form colleges.

Since then, the college has expanded from its original single building, with the addition of the Sports and Tennis Centre in 1995; the Colin Greenhalgh building, which houses most arts subjects such as English, modern languages and history; The Rob Wilkinson building housing the physics, chemistry, and PE departments was developed in 2004; in 2005 the Margaret Ingram Guidance Centre provided specialist tutorial accommodation.
Although the college previously had ambitious plans for a major redesign between 2010 and 2013, the economic crisis reduced the scope of the plans: in 2010 the college administrative areas were redesigned, more classrooms added in the physical sciences, psychology and art departments, the staffroom enlarged and relocated, the library partially refurbished, an extra resource area built to compensate for the space used to build new classrooms and the student social area rebuilt.

In the early 1990s responsibility for further education was removed from local authorities (as part of reforms aimed at reducing the level of the council tax), and Hills Road like other colleges moved to direct funding from central government.

Originally, the name Hills Road Sixth Form College was not favoured by the alumni preferring the name 'The Cantabrigian', however to this present day they have stuck with iconic name.

Results and reputation
In 2006, fifty-two Hills Road students gained places at Oxbridge; this was a larger number than at any other state school and represents one in every sixteen students. Hills Road was recently ranked third in a list of the schools with highest levels of Oxbridge entry, after Westminster School and Eton College. The Sunday Times reported that Hills Road sends approximately sixty-five students to the universities of Cambridge and Oxford every year.

In January 2014 Hills Road was named the "creme de la creme" of state schools by Tatler Magazine, and included in Tatler's list of thirty elite state school in the United Kingdom. The 2009 Alps Report placed the College third in the sixth form college performance table and in the top 1% for all institutions. According to the 2009 edition of the BBC's English school tables, the school's student have performed above average in A-Level examinations.

The college has achieved an Ofsted rating of 'Outstanding' from its first inspection in 2001.

Notable alumni

Cambridgeshire High School for Boys

 Martin Amis - novelist and son of Sir Kingsley Amis
 Syd Barrett and Roger Waters of the rock band Pink Floyd; there is a suggestion that the song Another Brick in the Wall Part II, written by Waters, which includes the famous lyrics "we don't need no education", bears reference to Waters' miserable stint endured whilst at the County High School for Boys
 Sir John Bradfield - Founder of Cambridge Science Park, the first Science Park in Europe.
 Bob Klose - an early member of Pink Floyd
 Storm Thorgerson - co-founder of the Hipgnosis partnership, who designed record covers for artists including Pink Floyd, Led Zeppelin, Genesis and Muse

Many other notable alumni are listed in the Alumni section of the Wikipedia entry for the Cambridgeshire High School for Boys.

Hills Road Sixth Form College
 Alison Balsom - trumpeter signed with EMI Classics
 Catherine Banner - Author
 Edward Dusinberre - First violinist of the Takács Quartet
 Tom Findlay - Musician, half of Groove Armada
Tom Hunt, serving Member of Parliament for Ipswich
 Katie Rowley Jones - West End actress
 Tim Key - Surreal comedian and poet
 Dave Lewis - former Tesco CEO
 Heather McRobie - Writer and academic
 Nemone Metaxas - Radio DJ
 Mark Pettini, Essex County cricketer (and former captain). Former member of England Under-19 team
 Hector Janse van Rensburg - watercolor painter, also known as Shitty Watercolour
 Surie - Singer, representing the United Kingdom in the 2018 Eurovision Song Contest with the song "Storm"
 Ben Thapa - member of male singing quartet G4
 Tom Westley, Essex County England Test cricketer and captain of England Under-19 at the 2008 Under-19 Cricket World Cup
 Cavetown - singer, songwriter, musician, and YouTuber
 Benedict Cork - singer, songwriter, musician

References

Schools in Cambridge
Educational institutions established in 1974
Learning and Skills Beacons
Sixth form colleges in Cambridgeshire